State Road 116 (SR 116) is a  state highway in the northeastern part of the U.S. state of Florida. It travels nearly due west-east entirely within the city limits of Jacksonville, in Duval County. At its west terminus, SR 116 is signed as Merrill Road beginning at the intersection with Interstate 295 (I-295; Jacksonville East Beltway) and SR 113 (Southside Connector) near the St. Johns River. At its eastern terminus, it is signed as Wonderwood Road, ending at the intersection with SR 101 (Mayport Road) just south of Naval Station Mayport. Here, the Wonderwood Road designation continues to Hanna Park.

Since the central purpose of SR 116 was to build a bridge over the Intracoastal Waterway connecting Wonderwood Drive to the rest of Jacksonville, locals often unofficially refer to SR 116 as "Wonderwood Connector" or simply "Wonderwood". Officially, the stretch is signed as a number of existing local roads that were utilized as parts of the route of SR 116. These sections are known as Merrill Road, Ft. Caroline Road, McCormick Road, Mt. Pleasant Road, and Wonderwood Drive.

History
Due to rapid growth in the East Arlington area and near SR 105 (Zoo Parkway/Heckscher Drive), a connection from the I-295 corridor to Naval Station Mayport was seen as a great need.

Over the years, traffic back-ups at the Atlantic Boulevard flyover ramp escalated, as it was the only direct route to the base. These back-ups often took hours to clear, and with the rapid growth in the area, combined with the need for another hurricane evacuation route, a new road was a necessity. The base needed a more-direct route from the corridor since it was easy for new people to the area to get lost on previous directions from exits on I-295, such as SR 10 (Atlantic Boulevard) and Monument Road.

The improvements to – and subsequent de facto replacement of – Merrill Road, Ft. Caroline Road, and McCormick Road occurred in stages. However, these roads are still in use today and are designated by signage still displayed on them.

Major intersections

See also

References

116
116
116